André Abegglen (7 March 1909 – 8 November 1944) was a Swiss football player and manager. As a forward he played for Grasshopper Club Zürich, the French club FC Sochaux-Montbéliard and the Swiss national team, for whom he appeared in two World Cups. He is the brother of Max Abegglen and Jean Abegglen, both players of the Swiss national team. He died in 1944, at the age of just 35.

Club career
In France, with Sochaux, he was the league champion in 1934–35 and 1937–38, and was the top goalscorer of the former, with 30 goals in 28 appearances.

International career
On 2 November 1930, Abbeglen scored his first and last hat-trick for Switzerland in a Friendly against the Netherlands. He was the shared top goal scorer of the 1931-32 Central European International Cup with 8 goals, alongside István Avar of Hungary. With 12 goals in the Central European International Cup, he is the third highest scorer in the competition's history, only behind the likes of Ferenc Puskas(15) and György Sárosi(17), both of Hungary. He played in the 1934 FIFA World Cup, scoring one goal, and in the 1938 FIFA World Cup, where he scored three goals against Germany, one in the round of 16 that ended in a 1–1 draw and two more in the replay, won by Switzerland 4–2. In total, he scored 29 goals in 52 matches for the Swiss team.

International goals
''Switzerland score listed first, score column indicates score after each Abegglen goal.

Honours

Club
Sochaux

Ligue 1:
Champions (2): 1934–35 and 1937–38

Individual
Top goalscorer of the 1934–35 French Division 1 with 30 goals
Top goalscorer of the 1931–32 Central European International Cup with 8 goals

References

External links 
 
 

1909 births
1944 deaths
Swiss men's footballers
Switzerland international footballers
FC Sochaux-Montbéliard players
Ligue 1 players
Grasshopper Club Zürich players
Servette FC players
FC La Chaux-de-Fonds players
1934 FIFA World Cup players
1938 FIFA World Cup players
Swiss football managers
FC Sochaux-Montbéliard managers
Servette FC managers
FC La Chaux-de-Fonds managers
People from Neuchâtel
Association football forwards
Sportspeople from the canton of Neuchâtel